Tegula puntagordana is a species of sea snail, a marine gastropod mollusk in the family Tegulidae.

Description
The size of the shell attains 16 mm.

Distribution
This marine species occurs off Venezuela at depths between 0 m and 16 m.

References

 Weisbord, N. E. 1962. Late Cenozoic gastropods from northern Venezuela. Bulletins of American Paleontology 42(193): 672 pp., 48 pls.

External links
 To Biodiversity Heritage Library (1 publication)
 To Encyclopedia of Life
 To World Register of Marine Species

puntagordana
Gastropods described in 1962